The Yorkton Bulldogs are a Junior B box lacrosse team based out of Yorkton, Saskatchewan. They are a member of the Prairie Gold Lacrosse League.

Founded in 2003, the Bulldogs gain most of their talent from Yorkton Minor Lacrosse, Whitewood and Sturgis, Saskatchewan, where they have an outstanding field lacrosse team and program.

History 
Scott Marianchuk created the current Yorkton Bulldogs team logo.

Yorkton Bulldogs have won the PGLL Junior Lacrosse Tier 2 championship twice (2008 and 2009).

On January 26, 2009, Bulldogs head coach, Darin Lanigan, resigned from his coaching duties. He was replaced by Joe Choptuik.

2014 was a difficult one for an inexperienced group, going 2-8-2 in the PGLL (sixth of seven teams). The team managed to score a league-low 81 goals in the regular season. Paul Toth led the team in scoring with 24 goals, 6 assists in just 9 league games. Goalie Louden Choptuik played every minute of every game for the Bulldogs, posting a 12.60 GAA.

Notable players

 Chris Lesanko - 2004 PGLL MVP and top scorer. Current PGLL Commissioner.
 Kyle Bazansky - played Senior A with Nanaimo Timbermen (2008) and college lacrosse at Lindenwood University (2009).

References

External links 
 Yorkton Bulldogs on PGLL website

Lacrosse teams in Saskatchewan
Sport in Yorkton